is a Japanese footballer currently playing as a forward. He currently without club.

Career statistics

Club
.

Notes

References

External links

1998 births
Living people
Japanese footballers
Association football forwards
Shizuoka Sangyo University alumni
J3 League players
Japan Football League players
Kamatamare Sanuki players
Suzuka Point Getters players